John Kerry was an English politician.

He was a Member (MP) of the Parliament of England for Hereford in 1559. He was Mayor of Hereford in 1555–1556.

References

Year of birth missing
Year of death missing
English MPs 1559
Mayors of Hereford